The 2014 Appalachian State Mountaineers football team represented Appalachian State University in the 2014 NCAA Division I FBS football season. They were led by second-year head coach Scott Satterfield and played their home games at Kidd Brewer Stadium. This season was the Mountaineers first season in the Sun Belt Conference. In their second year of their two-year FCS-to-FBS transition, the Mountaineers were eligible for the conference championship; however, they were not bowl-eligible.

After starting the season 1–5, the Mountaineers ended their first FBS season with a 6-game winning streak, finishing 7–5 overall and 6–2 in Sun Belt play with upset wins over last year's Sun Belt co-champions Arkansas State and Louisiana–Lafayette, good for third place in the Sun Belt.

Schedule

Schedule Source:

Game summaries

Michigan

Campbell

Southern Miss

Georgia Southern

South Alabama

Liberty

Troy

Georgia State

Louisiana–Monroe

Arkansas State

Louisiana–Lafayette

Idaho

References

Appalachian State
Appalachian State Mountaineers football seasons
Appalachian State Mountaineers football